The Disappearance is a Canadian television drama miniseries, which premiered on CTV in October 2017. Centred on the disappearance of a young boy, the series stars Peter Coyote, Camille Sullivan, Aden Young, Joanne Kelly and Micheline Lanctôt. It later premiered in the UK on the Universal in February 2018. It premiered in the United States on July 9, 2019 on WGN America.

The series was first developed in 2011 as a French language project written by Normand Daneau and Geneviève Simard, but after Productions Casablanca was unable to sell it to any of Quebec's francophone television networks they opted to translate the scripts into English, and were successful in pitching the series to Bell Media.

The series was directed by Peter Stebbings.

The series received several Canadian Screen Award nominations at the 6th Canadian Screen Awards, including Best Limited Series or Program and Best Actress in a Television Film or Miniseries (Sullivan).

Plot
While participating in a birthday treasure hunt, 10 year old Anthony Sullivan suddenly disappears in the Montreal suburbs. The investigation that follows uncovers many secrets buried by his family long ago. The family must come together in order to solve the mystery of Anthony's disappearance.

Cast
Peter Coyote as Henry Sullivan
Camille Sullivan as Helen Murphy Sullivan
Aden Young as Luke Sullivan
Joanne Kelly as Catherine Sullivan
Michael Riendeau as Anthony Sullivan
Micheline Lanctôt as Lieutenant Detective Susan Bowden
Kevin Parent as Sergeant-Detective Charles Cooper
Neil Napier as Fred Cameron

Episodes

References

External links
 
 
 

2010s Canadian television miniseries
2010s Canadian crime drama television series
CTV Television Network original programming
2017 Canadian television series debuts
2017 Canadian television series endings
Television shows filmed in Montreal
Television shows set in Montreal